The Last Voyage of the Demeter is an upcoming American supernatural horror film directed by André Øvredal. It is an adaptation of "The Captain's Log", a chapter from the 1897 Bram Stoker novel Dracula. The film stars Corey Hawkins, Aisling Franciosi, Liam Cunningham, and David Dastmalchian.

The Last Voyage of the Demeter is set to be released on August 11, 2023, by Universal Pictures.

Plot
Strange events befall the crew of the merchant ship known as the Demeter as they are stalked by a dark presence.

Cast
 Corey Hawkins as Clemens, a doctor who joins the Demeter.
 Aisling Franciosi as Anna, an unwitting stowaway.
 Liam Cunningham as the captain of the Demeter.
 David Dastmalchian as Wojchek, the Demeters first mate.
 Javier Botet as Dracula
 Jon Jon Briones
 Stefan Kapičić
 Nikolai Nikolaeff
 Woody Norman
 Martin Furulund
 Chris Walley
 Nicolo Pasetti as Deputy Hirsch

Production
In 2002, Bragi F. Schut wrote the initial screenplay for The Last Voyage of the Demeter, based on the singular chapter "The Captain's Log" from the 1897 novel Dracula by Bram Stoker, with Robert Schwentke on board to direct, as well as rewrite with partner Mitch Brian. However, the film languished in development hell for close to two decades with several other directors attached to the film including Stefan Ruzowitzky, Marcus Nispel, David Slade and Neil Marshall. At one point Noomi Rapace and Ben Kingsley were set to star in the film, with Viggo Mortensen "in talks".

In October 2019, it was announced André Øvredal would direct the film with Amblin Partners obtaining the rights. In January 2021, Corey Hawkins joined the cast of the film with a new draft written by Zak Olkewicz. In June 2021, David Dastmalchian, Liam Cunningham, Aisling Franciosi, Javier Botet, Jon Jon Briones, Stefan Kapičić, Nikolai Nikolaeff, Woody Norman, Martin Furulund and Chris Walley joined the cast of the film.

Principal photography began on June 30, 2021, in Berlin, before occurring in Malta, and ended on October 1. In December 2022, Schut and Olkewicz received screenplay credit, Schut received screen story credit, and  Mitch Brian, Lowell Cauffiel, James Hart, Ruzowitzky, and Schwentke received off-screen additional literary material credit.

Music
In April 2022, Thomas Newman was announced as composer for the film.

Release
The Last Voyage of the Demeter is scheduled to be released theatrically in the United States on August 11, 2023, by Universal Pictures. It was previously scheduled for January 27, 2023.

References

External links
 
 

Upcoming films
2023 horror films
2023 films
2020s American films
2020s English-language films
2020s supernatural horror films
Amblin Entertainment films
American supernatural horror films
American vampire films
Dracula films
DreamWorks Pictures films
Films based on works by Bram Stoker
Films directed by André Øvredal
Films scored by Thomas Newman
Films set on ships
Films shot in Berlin
Films shot in Malta
Phoenix Pictures films
Universal Pictures films
Upcoming English-language films